Haruni castle is a historical castle located in Abarkuh County in Yazd Province, The longevity of this fortress dates back to the Sasanian Empire.

References 

Castles in Iran
Sasanian castles